Goat River may refer to:

One of three rivers in British Columbia, Canada:
Goat River (Kootenay River), a tributary of the Kootenay River, joining it at the town of Creston
Goat River (Fraser River), a tributary of the upper Fraser on the east side of the Cariboo Mountains
Goat River (Central Coast), a river on the Central Coast of British Columbia, opening on Ursula Channel opposite Gribbell Island

It may also refer to:

Goat River, British Columbia, a railway point on the Canadian National Railway in the Robson Valley region of the upper Fraser or the associated rail station Goat River railway station
Goat River Rapids, a saltwater rapid in Ursula Channel on the Central Coast of British Columbia
Goat River, a stoner/doom band from Toulouse, France.

See also 
 Goat (disambiguation)
 Goat Creek (disambiguation)